Me Chama de Bruna ( Call me Bruna) is a Brazilian drama television series loosely based on the real story of Bruna Surfistinha (pen name of Raquel Pacheco), a former sex worker who attracted the attention of Brazilian media by publishing, in a blog, her sexual experiences with clients.  The series premiered on Fox Premium on October 8, 2016.

Premise 
Before becoming the most famous prostitute in Brazil, Raquel was just a middle-class 17-year-old teen girl with a dream of freedom; but as she leaves her parents house and adopting the pen name of Bruna Surfistinha, she will go through a dangerous underworld of sex, drugs and violence: the pains of growth will create deep marks in her personality.

Cast
 Maria Bopp - Raquel / Bruna 
 Carla Rivas - Stella
 Suzana Kruger - Nancy
 Jonathan Haagensen - Zé Ricardo 
 Stella Rabello - Georgette
 Luciana Paes - Mónica 
 Nash Laila - Jessica 
 Maitê Proença - Miranda
 Debora Ozório - Alice

Episodes 
Each episode lasts approximately 45 minutes. The television series consists of four seasons:
 Season 1 (8 episodes) - from October 9, 2016, to November 27, 2016
 Season 2 (8 episodes) - from October 22, 2017, to December 10, 2017
 Season 3 (8 episodes) - from December 7, 2018, to January 25, 2019
 Season 4 (8 episodes) - from December 13, 2019, to January 31, 2020

References

External links
 

2010s Brazilian television series
Brazilian drama television series
2016 Brazilian television series debuts
Portuguese-language television shows
Television shows set in São Paulo
Prostitution in Brazilian television